聖子 may refer to:
 Kiyoko, Japanese feminine given name
 Seong-ja, Korean feminine given name
 Seiko (given name), Japanese feminine given name